Afrida ydatodes, or Dyar's lichen moth, is a species of moth in the family Nolidae (nolid moths). It was described by Harrison Gray Dyar Jr. in 1913 and is found in North America, where it has been recorded from Alabama, Florida, Mississippi, North Carolina and Texas.

The wingspan is about 10 mm. Adults are similar to Afrida cosmiogramma, but diffused and irrorated. The white areas are pale grey from the dark irrorations and the central band is clouded and dark, its edges not forming strong lines, but only a little darker. The hindwings are whitish, with a grey discal point and terminal border.

The MONA or Hodges number for Afrida ydatodes is 8102.

References

Further reading
 Arnett, Ross H. (2000). American Insects: A Handbook of the Insects of America North of Mexico. CRC Press.
 Lafontaine, J. Donald & Schmidt, B. Christian (2010). "Annotated check list of the Noctuoidea (Insecta, Lepidoptera) of North America north of Mexico". ZooKeys, vol. 40, 1-239.

External links
Butterflies and Moths of North America
NCBI Taxonomy Browser, Afrida ydatodes

Nolidae
Moths described in 1913